Allostasis is the efficient regulation required to prepare the body to satisfy its needs before they arise by budgeting those needed resources such as oxygen, insulin etc., as opposed to homeostasis, in which the goal is a steady state. Allostasis, stability through variation, was proposed by Peter Sterling and Joseph Eyer in 1988 as a new model of physiological regulation. The goal of every living being is to “find and maintain a steady state for survival”  which is achieved through allostasis and homeostasis. The term allostasis is used more frequently now since it is more inclusive of the idea that not everything in the body is in a single steady state meaning that there are varying levels of energy.

Evolution and allostasis

A second perspective on allostasis is that it is included in the story of how the brain was created. Barrett argues that during evolution organisms' internal systems became much more advanced; continuing to just have several groups of cells would have poorly managed these new systems that these bodies were acquiring. A brain was needed instead because its large size is much more capable of efficient management. However, in rare cases animal species do not rely on brains nor a similar allostatic process. The sea squirt is one example because once the larvae have fully grown they “absorb their brain.” The sea squirt's allostatic process would not be as complex as a human's for example since both species have ecological niches that are of different complexities (i.e. ”All animals have brains that are adapted to their environmental niches and life cycles”).

Etymology 
Allostasis  was coined from the Greek ἄλλος (állos, "other," "different") + the στάσις (stasis, "standing still"). The concept was named by Sterling  and Eyer in 1988 to mean "remaining stable by being variable".

Nature of concept

Allostasis proposes a broader hypothesis than homeostasis: The key goal of physiological regulation is not rigid constancy; rather, it is flexible variation that anticipates the organism's needs and promptly meets them. Rather than simply responding to the environment, allostasis utilizes predictive regulation, which has a more complex goal in evolution of adaptation by changing based on what it anticipates, rather than by staying the same or "in balance" in response to environmental changes, as homeostasis suggests. This places homeostasis as a function within allostasis; however, some argue it is a larger paradigm altogether. Allostasis redefines health and disease beyond the stable measures from lab tests or blood pressure, for example; and expands it to define health as the flexibility of these values. Blood pressure is one of Sterling's prime examples of a health measure that is best when it can fluctuate in anticipation of the brain-body's expected demands, so it can match this demand. The alternative, or a less healthy state on the health-disease continuum, would be for blood pressure to remain the same, or "stable," and not meet the new demand.

Sung Lee (2019) introduced the paradigm of allostatic orchestration (PAO), extending the principle of allostasis (as originally put forth by Peter Sterling) stating, “The PAO originates from an evolutionary perspective and recognizes that biological set points change in anticipation of changing environments.”

The brain is the organ of central command, orchestrating cross-system operations to support optimal behavior at the level of the whole organism. The PAO describes differences between homeostasis and allostasis paradigms and conciliation of the paradigms illustrated with alternative views of post-traumatic stress disorder (PTSD). Lee states:
The allostatic state represents the integrated totality of brain-body interactions. Health itself is an allostatic state of optimal anticipatory oscillation, hypothesized to relate to the state of criticality… Diseases are allostatic states of impaired anticipatory oscillations, demonstrated as rigidifications of set points across the brain and body (disease comorbidity).
The PAO implications for health extend beyond blood pressure and diabetes to include addiction, depression, and deaths of despair (from alcohol, drugs, and suicide) that have been increasing since 2000, emphasizing that an integrated view of health includes environmental context. Allostasis encourages increased attention to new solutions at the level of society, as well as the individual and immediate community.

Allostatic regulation reflects, at least partly, cephalic involvement in primary regulatory events, in that it is anticipatory to systemic physiological regulation. This is different from homeostasis, which occurs in response to subtle ebb and flow. Both homeostasis and allostasis are endogenous systems responsible for maintaining the internal stability of an organism. Homeostasis is formed from the Greek adjective homoios, meaning "similar," and the noun stasis, meaning "standing;" thus, "standing at about the same level."

Wingfield states:The concept of allostasis, maintaining stability through change, is a fundamental process through which organisms actively adjust to both predictable and unpredictable events... Allostatic load refers to the cumulative cost to the body of allostasis, with allostatic overload... being a state in which serious pathophysiology can occur... Using the balance between energy input and expenditure as the basis for applying the concept of allostasis, two types of allostatic overload have been proposed.Sterling (2020) proposed several interrelated points that constitute the allostasis model:

 Animals are designed to be efficient.
 Efficiency requires a brain to predict what will be needed and avoid costly errors.
 The brain further enhances efficiency by prioritizing needs and enforcing trade-offs.
 All systems, including the brain, organ systems, and single cells are designed for a particular operating range. (Example, cone photoreceptors adapt for daylight, and rod photoreceptors adapt for moonlight and starlight).
 A system's parameters vary according to predicted demand and adapt their sensitivities. 
 While a wide range denotes a flexible and healthy system, when their evolved operating ranges are chronically exceeded, systems at all levels break down.

Sterling (2004) proposed six interrelated principles that underlie allostasis:
 Organisms are designed to be efficient.
 Efficiency requires reciprocal trade-offs.
 Efficiency also requires being able to predict future needs.
 Such prediction requires each sensor to adapt to the expected range of input.
 Prediction also demands that each effector adapt its output to the expected range of demand.
 Predictive regulation depends on behavior whilst neural mechanisms also adapt.

Mechanisms
Allostasis emphasizes that regulation must be efficient, whereas homeostasis makes no reference to efficiency. In addition, allostasis recognizes that efficiency requires predicting bodily needs to prevent errors, whereas homeostasis emphasizes detecting errors and correcting them – responding like a thermostat. Prediction requires the brain to: (i) collect information across all spatial and temporal scales; (ii) analyze, integrate, and decide what will be needed; (iii) exert feedforward control of all parameters. Naturally, many needs are somewhat unpredictable, so errors are inevitable; and for those errors, homeostatic mechanisms – feedback control – are available to correct them.  

Allostatic (predictive) regulation allows the brain to prioritize needs, for example, by sending more oxygen and nutrients to organs that need it most. For this example, during peak exercise muscle requires an 18-fold increase in oxygenated blood, but the heart can increase its capacity only 3.5-fold. Therefore, the brain temporarily borrows blood from the digestive system and kidney rerouting it to muscle. It later repays the debt when muscle's increased need subsides. Without the ability to prioritize trade-offs between organ systems, the heart and lungs would need to be far larger while much of this costly extra capacity would go unused.

Predictive regulation also occurs at the cellular and systems levels. When humans are chronically stressed, the brain chronically raises blood pressure; then arterial muscles predict higher pressure and respond with hypertrophy (like skeletal muscles when we lift weights). Gradually the whole cardiovascular system adapts to life at an elevated pressure level. This is known as chronic hypertension, which elevates mortality from cardiovascular disease and stroke. Similarly, a chronically high carbohydrate diet requires chronically high blood glucose and leads to chronically high levels of insulin that increase in anticipation of the need to manage the high level of carbohydrates. Cells that express insulin receptors, predicting high insulin, adapt by reducing their sensitivity (like photoreceptors in bright light). This leads to type 2 diabetes and elevated mortality from many causes. Although physicians term this response insulin resistance, it can be better understood as consequent to predictive regulation.

Every system evolves to operate over a particular range. For example, cone photoreceptors evolved to sense daylight over a 10,000-fold range of intensities, whereas rod photoreceptors evolved a different design to sense moonlight and starlight down to detection of single photons. To function optimally across their wide operating ranges, all systems adapt their sensitivities. A rod photoreceptor adapts to bright moonlight and requires minutes to increase its sensitivity to starlight. When a system is chronically forced beyond its intended operating range—as by chronic high carbohydrate diet or other stress—the limits of adaptation are exceeded, and systems break down. This condition was termed by Bruce McEwen as allostatic load. The health of an organism is maintained when operating within certain parameters, but having dynamic variability of range.

Too much allostasis, also known as allostatic “overload” can lead to various negative consequences as American Addiction Centers write, “The cost of adapting to external conditions becomes so high that it causes mental or physical disease." From a metaphorical perspective this can be interpreted as a machine running continuously as the machine is overworked; it becomes less efficient over time because more stress is placed on it. Similarly, the process of allostasis becomes less efficient at managing the body's resources when the body endures increased levels of unhealthy stress due to wear and tear on the body and the brain. An increase in Allostatic load can impair and reduce neuroplasticity as stress causes the brain to age quicker. This is because with more stress, more synaptic connections are lost in the prefrontal cortex which is responsible for body regulation.

Allostasis can be carried out by means of alteration in HPA axis hormones, the autonomic nervous system, cytokines, or a number of other systems, and is generally adaptive in the short term. Allostasis is essential in order to maintain internal viability amid changing conditions.

Allostasis provides compensation for various problems, such as in compensated heart failure, compensated kidney failure, and compensated liver failure. However, such allostatic states are inherently fragile, and decompensation can occur quickly, as in acute decompensated heart failure.

Related terms 
The term heterostasis is also used in place of allostasis, particularly where state changes are finite in number and therefore discrete (e.g. computational processes).

Types
McEwen and Wingfield propose two types of allostatic overload which result in different responses:

Type 1 allostatic overload occurs when energy demand exceeds supply, resulting in activation of the emergency life history stage. This serves to direct the animal away from normal life history stages into a survival mode that decreases allostatic load and regains positive energy balance. The normal life cycle can be resumed when the perturbation passes.

Type 2 allostatic overload begins when there is sufficient or even excess energy consumption accompanied by social conflict and other types of social dysfunction. The latter is the case in human society and certain situations affecting animals in captivity. In all cases, secretion of glucocorticosteroids and activity of other mediators of allostasis such as the autonomic nervous system, CNS neurotransmitters, and inflammatory cytokines wax and wane with allostatic load. If allostatic load is chronically high, then pathologies develop. Type 2 allostatic overload does not trigger an escape response, and can only be counteracted through learning and changes in the social structure.

Whereas both types of allostasis are associated with increased release of cortisol and catecholamines, they differentially affect thyroid homeostasis: Concentrations of the thyroid hormone triiodothyronine are decreased in type 1 allostasis, but elevated in type 2 allostasis. This may result from type 2 allostatic load increasing the set point of pituitary-thyroid feedback control.

Allostatic load

In the long run, the maintenance of allostatic changes over a long period may result in wear and tear, the so-called allostatic load. If a dehydrated individual is helped but continues to be stressed and hence does not reinstate normal body function, the individual's body systems will wear out.

Criticism
In 2005, Trevor A. Day has argued that the concept of allostasis is no more than a renaming of the original concept of homeostasis.

See also
 Homeostasis
 Practopoiesis

References

Further reading
 
  Contains an entire paragraph dedicated to defining allostasis.

Anxiety
Immune system
Neuroendocrinology
Stress (biology)